The National Defense Act of 1935 (Commonwealth Act No. 1) was passed by the Philippine National Assembly on December 21, 1935. The purpose of this act was to create an independent Philippine military, a move interrupted by the outbreak of the Second World War.

Provisions
This act provided for the creation, by 1946, via an annual appropriation of 16,000,000 pesos, of the following forces:

A regular army force of 10,000 troops (formed largely from the Philippine Scouts and the Philippine Constabulary)
A reserve army of 400,000
The Offshore Patrol, which was to possess 36 torpedo boats
A Philippine Army Air Corps of 100 tactical bombers

Office of the Military Advisor
The National Assembly was guided by the Office of the Military Advisor to the Commonwealth Government under the U.S. General Douglas MacArthur.

Military Districts
The act divided the Commonwealth of the Philippines into ten military districts, similar to the prewar corps areas within the US. Each district had a roughly equal population and each was to initially provide 1 reserve division, and ultimately three.

Luzon, Mindoro, Palawan, and Masbate contained 5 military districts
Mindanao and the Sulu Archipelago constituted 1 district
The Visayas contained 4 districts

Reserve Training
The Act provided for the drafting of Filipino men, between the ages of 21 and 50, into the 30 reserve divisions. This force was to be raised through 2 training camps, of 20,000 men each, lasting 22 weeks. The camps would be staffed by members of the regular army.

The first group of 20,000 troops was drafted on January 1, 1937, and there were 4,800 officers and 104,000 enlisted men in the reserves by 1939.

Officer Training
For the training of junior officers, the Act provided that a military academy be established with a Cadet Corps strength not to exceed 350 at any one time. As graduates could not be expected until they had completed 4 years of training, selected reservists were selected for training as noncommissioned officers. The best of these were then given basic office training and commissioned as 3rd Lieutenants. Officers were also created through senior-level ROTC courses in colleges and universities.

Training Locations
Infantry training—various locations
Field Artillery training—Fort Dau and specialized training conducted at Fort William McKinley
Coastal Artillery training -- Fort Mills, Fort Stotsenburg (antiaircraft), and Fort Wint
Signal and medical training -- Fort William McKinley
Quartermaster motor transport school — Port area of Manila
Government organizational training—various locations

See also
Military History of the Philippines
Military History of the United States

External links
The National Defense Act of 1935

Military history of the Philippines
Philippines
1935 in military history
1935 in the Philippines
Conscription law
Commonwealth of the Philippines